The Mexibús Line III is a bus rapid transit (BRT) line in the Mexibús system. It was the third line to be built and the second to be opened. It operates between Chimalhuacán, in the State of Mexico and Pantitlán metro station in Iztacalco and Venustiano Carranza, in Mexico City. It was inaugurated by the governor of the State of Mexico, Eruviel Ávila on 30 April 2013 with 29 stations. Another station was opened later. The line operates with 85 articulated buses.

Stations
There are four service variations provided on the line:
 O: Pantitlán-Chimalhuacán local (27 stops)
 EX-1: Pantitlán-Acuitlapilco express (13 stops)
 EX-2: Pantitlán-Chimalhuacán express (8 stops)
 EX-3: Pantitlán-Rayito de Sol express (8 stops)

The buses are white with red, light and dark green trim.

{| width="80%"  class="wikitable"
! colspan="2" align="center" width="30%"| Station
!align="center"|O
!align="center"|EX-1
!align="center"|EX-2
!align="center"|EX-3
! align="center"| Location
! align="center"| Connection
! align="center"| Picture
! align="center"| Opened
|-
| rowspan="30" width="2%" bgcolor="94c83c" |  
|  Pantitlán
|●
|●
|●
|●
| Iztacalco and Venustiano Carranza, Mexico City
|
 Pantitlán
  Line 1: Pantitlán
  Line 5: Pantitlán
  Line 9: Pantitlán
  Line A: Pantitlán
  Line 4 (Alameda Oriente branch): Pantitlán station
 Route: 168
 Line 2: Pantitlán stop
 Routes: 11-B, 11-C, 19-F, 19-G
| 
| 30 April 2013
|-
|  Calle 6
|●
|
|
|●
| Venustiano Carranza, Mexico City
| 
  Line 4 (Alameda Oriente branch): Calle 6 station
| 
| 4 November 2019
|-
|  El Barquito
|●
|●
|
|●
| rowspan="16" | Nezahualcóyotl
| rowspan="28" |
| 
| rowspan="28" | 30 April 2013
|-
|  Maravillas
|●
|
|
|
| 
|-
|  Vicente Riva Palacio
|●
|●
|●
|●
| 
|-
|  Virgencitas
|●
|
|
|
| 
|-
|  Nezahualcóyotl
|●
|●
|
|
| 
|-
|  Lago de Chapala
|●
|
|
|
| 
|-
|  Adolfo López Mateos
|●
|●
|●
|●
| 
|-
|  Palacio Municipal
|●
|●
|
|●
| 
|-
|  Sor Juana Inés de la Cruz
|●
|
|
|
|  
|-
|  El Castillo
|●
|
|
|
| 
|-
|  General Vicente Villada
|●
|●
|●
|●
| 
|-
|  Rayito de Sol
|●
|●
|
|●
| 
|-
|  Las Mañanitas
|●
|
|
|
| 
|-
|  Rancho Grande
|●
|
|
|
| 
|-
|  Bordo de Xochiaca
|●
|
|
| 
| 
|-
|  Las Torres
|●
|●
|●
|
| 
|-
|  Guerrero Chimalli
|●
|
|
|
| rowspan="12" | Chimalhuacán
| 
|-
|  Las Flores
|●
|●
|
|
| 
|-
|  Canteros
|●
|
|
|
| 
|-
|  La Presa
|●
|●
|●
|
| 
|-
|  Embarcadero
|●
|
|
|
| 
|-
|  Santa Elena
|●
|
|
|
| 
|-
|  Ignacio Manuel Altamirano
|●
|
|
| 
|-
|  San Pablo
|●
|
|
| 
|-
|  Los Patos
|●
|●
|●
|
| 
|-
|  Refugio
|●
|
|
|
| 
|-
|  Acuitlapilco
|●
|●
|
|
| 
|-
|  Chimalhuacán
|●
|
|●
|
| 
|}

Planned expansion
The line is expected to be expanded eastward towards Chicoloapan de Juárez, adding 24 stations and 4.5 kilometers to it.

Notes

References

External links
 

2013 establishments in Mexico
3